Ballard Elementary School District is located in the rural town of Ballard, California, United States, serving residents of the Santa Ynez Valley.

The district was founded in 1882 and was the first school in the valley. There is one school in this district, Ballard Elementary. Ballard Elementary is a Kindergarten through 6th grade school originally built in 1886 as a one-room schoolhouse. The "little red schoolhouse" is still used today by the Kindergarten and 1st grades. 128 students attend this school. Ballard School has become renowned for its quality of instruction, achieving second place among 43 school district results for Santa Barbara County, in the 2006 No Child Left Behind testing program.

References

External links
 
 School history

School districts in Santa Barbara County, California
School districts established in 1882
1882 establishments in California